Khanabad (also Romanized as Khānābād; also known as Khānābād-e Sar Āsīāb and Emamabad (Persian: امام آباد), also Romanized as Emāmābād) is a village in Heshmatabad Rural District, in the Central District of Dorud County, Lorestan Province, Iran. At the 2006 census, its population was 367, in 79 families.

References 

Towns and villages in Dorud County